John Carroll Catholic High School is a co-educational private school in Birmingham, Alabama, United States and is one of six Catholic high schools serving the Roman Catholic Diocese of Birmingham in Alabama.

Background

One of the first projects envisioned by Archbishop Thomas J. Toolen, when he was assigned to the former Mobile-Birmingham Diocese in 1927, was the establishment of a Catholic high school in this area. However, John Carroll Catholic High School would still be a dream if it were not for the leadership and dedication of a Birmingham layman, Mr. John Carroll. Mr. Carroll, at a testimonial dinner for the Archbishop, began an organization - The Friends of Catholic Education - to raise funds for a Catholic high school in Birmingham. The memory of Mr. Carroll's dedication lives on in the name of the school, John Carroll Catholic.

The construction of John Carroll Catholic High School on Highland Avenue began in November 1946. Ten months later, on September 8, 1947, the main educational unit was opened. In 1951 the Bishop Toolen Center, located at the east end of the campus, was completed.

The Center housed the gymnasium-auditorium, physical educational facilities and the fine arts facilities. The cafeteria and bookstore were added in 1957, followed a year later by the addition of the east wing, which housed classroom facilities. In 1957 property on Montclair Road was cleared for athletics with the completion of the athletic complex in 1961, including the football field, baseball field, running track and club house. Two years later, the second phase was completed, including the erection of bleachers, lights for the football field and a concession stand. In September 1981, the Activity Center, formerly the Benedictine Convent, was opened, which included a faculty facility, art room and guidance offices.

On December 9, 1989, Bishop Raymond Boland held a press conference to announce plans for the construction of a new John Carroll Catholic High School; ground breaking ceremonies and construction began April 8, 1990. The campus, including all academic, fine arts and athletic facilities, is a tribute to the generosity of the Bruno Family and the entire Birmingham community.

John Carroll Catholic moved to the new site on Lakeshore Parkway and began school there in August 1992. The dedication of the new school was held by then Bishop Raymond Boland on September 4, 1992.

The class ring is green onyx and was adopted in 1964.

The school hosted flying disc competitions at the 2022 World Games.

Notable alumni

References

External links
 
 

Educational institutions established in 1946
Catholic secondary schools in Alabama
High schools in Birmingham, Alabama
1946 establishments in Alabama
Schools in Jefferson County, Alabama